Lodhi Khel لودھی خیل is a small Town located in Khyber-Pakhtunkhwa province of Pakistan.

It is a Shia dominated area and the main Pashtun tribe living there is Bangash

Post Address - Village And Post Office Lodhi Khel District And Tehsil Hangu 

Postal Code - 26196

Coordinates and location type

Area Type: Populated place
Location Type: Populated Place
Latitude: 33.58972
Longitude: 71.16972
Latitude (DMS): 33° 35' 23 N
Longitude (DMS): 71° 10' 11 E

Lodhi Khel Location by Google Earth

 Populated places in Khyber Pakhtunkhwa